Thiruvail  is a village in the southern state of Karnataka, India. It is located in the Mangalore taluk of Dakshina Kannada district.

Demographics
 India census, Thiruvail had a population of 6336 with 3043 males and 3293 females.

See also
 Mangalore
 Dakshina Kannada
 Districts of Karnataka

References

External links
 http://dk.nic.in/

Villages in Dakshina Kannada district
Localities in Mangalore